...Best II is a compilation album by the Smiths. It was released on November 2, 1992, by the new owner of their back catalogue, WEA (Sire Records in the United States). Its highest British chart position was #29; it did not chart in the U.S.

Background
WEA (now the Warner Music Group) had acquired the entire Smiths back catalogue in early 1992 (sister label Sire Records already had the North American rights). Along with the re-release of all original albums and compilations, they immediately set to work compiling a 'best of' collection in two volumes. It was the first time a regular best of compilation had ever been made of The Smiths' material and the first volume effortlessly reached the top of the British charts. This, the second volume, fared considerably worse. The British press continued to groan about sell-out and low track selection coherence.

The material is more or less picked and sequenced at random, and consists of both singles and album cuts. As with the first volume, in the UK a spin-off single was released: "There Is a Light That Never Goes Out" (which had originally been earmarked as a single back in 1986 but was ultimately passed over in favour of "Bigmouth Strikes Again"). The single was released ahead of the compilation album and reached No. 25.

Cover 
The UK and European release of the record featured the right half of a 1960s biker couple photograph by Dennis Hopper on its sleeve, with Best...I completing the picture; the U.S. sleeve was designed by singer Morrissey and once again features Richard Davalos, co-star of East of Eden (other shots of Davalos grace the covers of Strangeways, Here We Come and the U.S. edition of Best...I).

Track listing 
All tracks written by Morrissey and Johnny Marr (including "Oscillate Wildly").

 "The Boy with the Thorn in His Side" (album version) (Single A-side) – 3:16
 "The Headmaster Ritual" (From Meat Is Murder) – 4:52
 "Heaven Knows I'm Miserable Now" (Single A-side) – 3:34
 "Ask" (album version) (Single A-side) – 3:15
 "Oscillate Wildly" (B-side of "How Soon Is Now?") – 3:26
 "Nowhere Fast" (From Meat is Murder) – 2:35
 "Still Ill" (From The Smiths) – 3:20
 "Bigmouth Strikes Again" (Single A-side) – 3:14
 "That Joke Isn't Funny Anymore" (album version) (Single A-side) – 4:57
 "Shakespeare's Sister" (Single A-side) – 2:08
 "Girl Afraid" (B-side of "Heaven Knows I'm Miserable Now") – 2:46
 "Reel Around the Fountain" (From The Smiths) – 5:56
 "Last Night I Dreamt That Somebody Loved Me"  (album version) (Single A-side) – 5:02
 "There Is a Light That Never Goes Out" (Single A-side) – 4:02

Personnel 
 Morrissey – vocals
 Johnny Marr – guitars, keyboard instruments, harmonica, mandolins, synthesized string and flute arrangements
 Andy Rourke – bass guitar, cello on "Oscillate Wildly" and "Shakespeare's Sister"
 Mike Joyce – drums
 Craig Gannon – rhythm guitar on "Ask"

Additional musicians 
 Kirsty MacColl – backing vocals on "Ask"
 Paul Carrack – piano and organ on "Reel Around the Fountain".

Production 
 John Porter – producer (A2, A5-A6, B2-B3)
 The Smiths – producers (A3-A4, A7, B4-B5)
 Morrissey and Marr – producers (A1, B1, B7)
 Johnny Marr, Morrissey and Stephen Street – producers (B6)

Certifications and sales

References 

The Smiths compilation albums
1992 greatest hits albums
Albums produced by Stephen Street
Warner Music Group compilation albums